Ga-eun, Gaeun, or Ka Un is a Korean feminine given name.

People with this name include:
Kim Ga-eun, a South Korean actress
Kim Ga-eun (badminton), a South Korean badminton player
Jeong Ga-eun, a South Korean actress
Yoon Ga-eun, a South Korean film director
, a South Korean singer

Fictional characters with this name include:
Gaeun Lee, a protagonist from  anime
Lee Gaeun from Produce 101